Podocarpus neriifolius is a species of conifer in the family Podocarpaceae. It grows 10–15m tall, though very occasionally taller, in tropical and subtropical wet closed forests, between 650m and 1600m altitude. In Cambodia however it grows in a dwarf form some 2–4m tall, at Bokor, some 1000m elevation.

It is found in India, Bangladesh, Nepal, China, Myanmar, Thailand, Laos, Cambodia, Vietnam, Malaysia, Indonesia, Brunei, the Philippines, Papua New Guinea, Solomon Islands, Fiji and Bhutan

Its common name in Khmer is srô:l.

It has a yellowish wood, used in construction in Cambodia, where it is graded 2nd category (not as good as 1st, but above others).

References

neriifolius
Trees of China
Flora of tropical Asia
Least concern plants
Taxonomy articles created by Polbot
Flora of Malesia